Samuel Bryan (September 30, 1759 in Philadelphia  October 6, 1821 in Chester County, Pennsylvania) was a resident of Pennsylvania and Anti-Federalist author, who wrote during the Confederation Period. Historians generally ascribe to him the letters written under the pseudonym Centinel between 1787 and 1789. Centinel attacked the proposed Constitution of the United States as a document in the interests of the "well-born few". He was the son of George Bryan, a judge on the Pennsylvania Supreme Court and the principal Anti-Federalist in the state, to whom the essays were frequently attributed at the time they were written.

Centinel wrote three series of essays. The first eighteen numbers appeared in late 1787 and early 1788, and reflected the Anti-Federalist opposition to the Constitution. Letters XIX through XXIV were produced toward the end of 1788. By this time, the Constitution had been adopted, and these essays sought to sway the election of representatives to the new government. In 1789, a final series of 69 papers appeared regarding proposed amendments to the Constitution.

Political career 
In 1784, Bryan became the secretary of the Pennsylvania Council of Censors, and was elected clerk of the state assembly in 1785. In 1790 he ran for the office of clerk of the state senate, but lost. In 1795 he was appointed state register general by Gov. Thomas Mifflin. In 1801 he became state comptroller general. In 1807 he lost a race for state treasurer. From 1809 to 1821 he served as Philadelphia register of wills.

References

External links 
 Timeline and full text for Letters of Centinel

1759 births
1821 deaths
People of colonial Pennsylvania
Anti-Federalists
Writers from Pennsylvania